Park Royal is an area in North West London, England, partly in the London Borough of Brent and partly the London Borough of Ealing.

It is the site of the largest business park in London, but despite intensive existing use, the area is, together with adjacent Old Oak Common, intended to become the UK's largest regeneration scheme. This arises from the area's relatively central location and also the strong and improving transport links which will include (at Old Oak Common), HS2 and the Elizabeth line. The scale of redevelopment has led to the Park Royal and Old Oak area being described as a potential "Canary Wharf of West London".

Location

To the north of Park Royal is Harlesden in the northeast, West Twyford, an outlying area of Ealing, in the northwest, and a Network Rail depot at Stonebridge Park in the far north, which also has London Underground Bakerloo line tracks running through it (and Harlesden station nearby). On the eastern side, Park Royal is bounded by Acton Lane and Park Royal Road (B4492). The Central Middlesex Hospital is located here.

The Grand Union Canal runs through the middle of the Park Royal industrial estate, with pedestrian access via the towpath.

History
The name Park Royal derives from the short-lived showgrounds opened in 1903 by the Royal Agricultural Society as a permanent exhibition site for the society's annual show. After only three years the society sold the site, and returned to a touring format for its shows. With its road, rail and canal links, Park Royal was subsequently developed for industrial use, mainly during the 1930s.

For many years it was a centre of engineering, with firms including Park Royal Vehicles, GKN and Landis and Gyr.

Queens Park Rangers F.C. played on two grounds in Park Royal. The first was the Horse Ring, later the site of the Guinness brewery, which had a capacity of 40,000. The club was forced to move out in February 1915 as the ground was taken over by the Army.

On 12 December 1908, the first ever rugby league test match between Great Britain and Australia took place at the Park Royal Ground in front of 2,000 fans. The match ended in a 22-all draw and was played as part of the first ever Kangaroo Tour.

The Guinness Sports Club hosted some of the field hockey events for the 1948 Summer Olympics.

Economy and redevelopment

Existing
Park Royal business park has over 1,200 businesses, employing an estimated 35,000 workers. Approximately 500 food companies operate at Park Royal, employing more than 14,000 people.

Park Royal also has areas of residential housing and amenities serving them. Park Royal Business Park is promoted commercially by the Park Royal Partnership, which is part of West London Business.

On the southern side beyond the arterial Western Avenue (A40), which leads to the Hanger Lane Gyratory System, is the Royale Leisure Park, which contains a cinema (which closed in June 2020), restaurants, arcade and a bowling alley. There is also a B&Q superstore, Renault and Nissan Car Dealerships, a Staples Superstore and other industrial buildings comprising the southern half of Park Royal. Park Royal Underground station, on the Piccadilly line, is located just off Western Avenue. To the west of Park Royal is Hanger Hill and the North Circular Road (A406).

As well as many small industrial firms, Park Royal is the location of some large company buildings, including McVities and Heinz. The old Guinness brewery and sports ground site at the south-western extremity of the district has now been totally demolished, however the rail sidings are still in use for aggregate freight traffic supplying the Lafarge Tarmac depot.  The first building erected adjacent to the new roundabout and bridge link to Western Avenue is occupied by international drinks company Diageo, owner of the Guinness brand and the redevelopment site. The Female Health Company, which manufactures Femidoms, has one of its two manufacturing plants here, too.

It is public policy to maintain Park Royal as predominantly a business area. It is designated as an Opportunity Area, and in 2008 the Mayor of London's office published a draft Planning Framework which aspires to maintain, "growing economic clusters of food/drink, transport/logistics and television/film." The framework does not preclude use of parts of the site for housing.

In summer 2011, the London Borough of Hammersmith and Fulham launched a Park Royal City plan for Old Oak Common, based around the immediate eastern border of North Acton, including light-rail lines to nearby areas.

Park Royal has a large ASDA superstore that serves the few locals but also many more people from surrounding areas like Harlesden.

Re-development

The Old Oak and Park Royal redevelopment area is envisaged to provide 65,000 new jobs and 25,000 new homes.

The Renault dealership has been sold to Ark Data Centres, who is currently building a new data centre site, Alliance Park.

Transport

Road
Park Royal is served by the A40 and A406 roads, and is situated close to a major interchange called the Hanger Lane gyratory.

Cycle Network
There is a proposal to build a Barclays Cycle Superhighway CS10 from Hyde Park to Park Royal, which is under review by Transport for London.

London Cycle Network routes 40, 42, 84 and 85 all serve Park Royal.

Underground and Overground
Stations in the area are:
Hanger Lane Station (Central line)
Park Royal Station (Piccadilly line)
Stonebridge Park Station (Bakerloo line & Watford DC Line)
Harlesden Station (Bakerloo line & Watford DC Line) - partly in the district.

Future transport developments
As well as HS2 and the Elizabeth line at adjacent Old Oak Common, three possible new transport services have been proposed for the area: the West London Orbital, Fastbus and the North and West London Light railway.

In 2004, the multinational Diageo company agreed to build extra Central line platforms at Park Royal tube station, as part of its First Central business park, built on the site of the (now demolished) Guinness brewery. This is not being actively pursued; London Underground said that the transport benefits of a Park Royal station on the Central line are not sufficiently high to justify the costs of construction.

References

External links

Park Royal Business Group
West London Business
February 2008 draft planning framework
Park Royal Business Group

 
Venues of the 1948 Summer Olympics
Olympic field hockey venues
Manufacturing industries in London
Food processing in London
Areas of London
Districts of the London Borough of Brent
Places formerly in Middlesex